This is a list of golf course architects and golf course design firms. Golf course architecture is a specific discipline of landscape design, with many architects represented in the United States by the American Society of Golf Course Architects. Some architects are highly successful professional golfers who went on to design golf courses.

A
Paul Albanese
Charles Hugh Alison
Peter Alliss
Mary Armstrong
Kevin Atkinson 
Edmund Ault
Dave Axland

B
Seve Ballesteros
Rick Baril
Gene Bates
Brad Bell
William Francis Bell
William P. Bell
Tom Bendelow
Kevin Benedict
Bill Bergin
Cary Bickler
Bruce Borland
Harry Bowers
James Braid

C
Tony Cashmore
Billy Casper
Bobby Clampett
Clive Clark, golfer and architect
Thomas Clark
Mike Clayton
George Cobb
Neil Coles
Rob Collins 
Colt, Alison & Morrison Ltd
Harry Colt
Blake Conant
Pete Cooper, golfer and architect
 Bill Coore (partner with Ben Crenshaw)Coore & Crenshaw | Timeless by Design
Geoffrey Cornish
Brian E. Costello, ASGCA, international architect 
Henry Cotton, golfer and architect
Colton Craig
Ben Crenshaw (partner with Bill Coore)
George Arthur Crump
Bob Cupp
Brian Curley
Keith Cutten

D
David Dale
Ben Davey, Australian golf course architect.
Johnny Dawson
Glen Day
Bruce Devlin
Mike DeVries
Bill Diddel
W. H. Diddle
Ida Dixon (1854–1916), first female golf course architect in the United States
Tom Doak
 Frank Duane  https://www.golfpass.com/travel-advisor/architects/1076-francis-duane/
 George Duncan, golfer and architect
Tom Dunn
Cynthia Dye
Alice Dye, one of the few female architects
Pete Dye

E
Martin Ebert
Todd Eckenrode
Chandler Egan
Prosper Ellis
Ernie Els
Devereux Emmet (1861–1934)
Abe Espinosa
European Golf Design

F
Nick Faldo
George Fazio
Tom Fazio
Willie Fernie
Forrest Fezler
Homer Fieldhouse
William Flynn
Ross Forbes
Keith Foster
John Fought
Walter Fovargue
William Herbert Fowler
Kyle Franz
Dana Fry
Ron Fream

G
Major Ram Gurung
Jonathan Gaunt
Timothy Gerrish
Simon Gidman
Clark Glasson
Bob Goalby
Kye Goalby
Robert Muir Graves
Hubert Green
Denis Griffiths ASGCA
Caspar Grauballe
Andrew Green
Bob Gwynne

H
Eddie Hackett
Dan Halldorson
Gil Hanse
John Harbottle III
Kevin Hargrave
Peter Harradine
Martin Hawtree
Mark Hayes
Randy Heckenkemper
Arthur Hills
David Hemstock
Marion Hollins
Robert Hunter
Johnny Ross Henry, golfer, antique club collector, club maker and architect
Frank Hummel

I
Hale Irwin
International Design Group, specialist golf course designers & architects
Eric Iverson

J
Tony Jacklin
John Jacobs, English golfer and architect
Don January
Paul Jansen
Bill Johnston, golfer and architect
Clyde Johnston
Clyde Johnson, 
Bobby Jones, legendary golfer and architect
David Jones, golfer and architect
Rees Jones
Robert Trent Jones
Robert Trent Jones, Jr.

K
Yoshikazu Kato 
David McLay Kidd
Tad King 
Ron Kirby 
Tom Kite
Gary Koch
Harley Kruse 
Donald Knott, 1994–1995 ASGCA President

L
Joe Lee
Jim Lipe
Tim Lobb
Emil Loeffler
Davis Love III
Christian Lundin
Chris Lutzke
Jeff Lynch

M
A.V. Macan
Charles B. Macdonald
Alister MacKenzie
Tom Mackenzie
Richard Mandell
Mark Mahannah
Ellis Maples
Graham Marsh
Greg Martin
Billy Martindale
W. Bruce Matthews III
Perry Maxwell
Shelley Mayfield
Tom McBroom
Mark McCumber
Peter McEvoy
Harold "Jug" McSpaden
Steve Melnyk
Johnny Miller
Jeff Mingay
Mike Morley
Old Tom Morris
Jay Morrish
John Stanton Fleming Morrison
Mark Mungeam
Robert McNeil
Ken Moodie

N
Pirapon Namatra
Vijit Nandrajog
Jack Nicklaus
Kevin Norby
Greg Norman
Bernard Nicholls
Dick Nugent
Nai Chung Chang
 Michel Niedbala, Golf Optimum, Best Golf Course Designer / BUILD 2017 - Architecture Awards

O
Pete Oakley
Paul O'Brien
Christy O'Connor Jnr
Willie Ogg
Jaime Ortiz-Patino

P
Larry Packard
Arnold Palmer
Willie Park, Jr.
Jerry Pate
Ross Perrett
Richard Phelps
Kyle Phillips
Agustin Piza
Don Placek
Gary Player
Ralph Plummer
Frank Pont
Bill Powell
Jimmy Powell
Ron Prichard
Dan Proctor
Hal Purdy

R
Henry Ransom
Tyler Rae
Joginder Rao
John Raese
Seth Raynor
Dean Refram
Wilfrid Reid
Forrest L. Richardson
Stephen Ridgway
Steve Ritson
Robert Lawrence
Allan Robertson
Ted Robinson
Bill Robinson
John F Robinson
Rocky Roquemore
Brian Ross
Donald Ross
Mackenzie Ross

S
Ben Sayers
David Pandel Savic
Lee Schmidt
Brian Schneider
Kipp Schulties
Ed Seay
Donald Sechrest
Barry Serafin
Geoff Shackelford
Scot Sherman
Bob Shearer
Brian Silva
Tom Simpson
Brian Slawnik
Steve Smyers
Annika Sörenstam
Philip Spogárd
Dr. Arthur Spring
Christoph Städler
Bert Stamps
Donald Steel
Jason Straka
Mike Strantz
Herbert Strong
Bruce Summerhays
Howard Swan

T
John Henry Taylor
Dave Thomas
George C. Thomas, Jr.
Stanley Thompson
Peter Thomson
Lassi Pekka Tilander 
A. W. Tillinghast
Herbert Charles Tippet
Walter Travis
Alfred H. Tull 
Herbert J. Tweedie

U
Osamu Ueda

V
Harry Vardon
George Von Elm
Douw van der Merwe

W
Jim Wagner, Nicklaus Design
Jim Wagner, Hanse Golf Course Design
William Watson
Bobby Weed
Tom Weiskopf
Beau Welling
Robert W. White
Ron Whitman
Chet Williams</ref>
Chris Wilczynski
Hugh Irvine Wilson
Derrell Witt
Norman H. Woods
Tiger Woods

Y
John Francis Yuhas, Golf Course Architect

Z

References

External links
 American Society of Golf Course Architects member list
 European Institute of Golf Course Architects, EIGCA member list

 
Golf-related lists
Lists of architects